Tillandsia chlorophylla is a species of flowering plant in the genus Tillandsia. This species is native to Belize, Guatemala, and southern Mexico (Veracruz, Oaxaca, Chiapas).

Cultivars
 Tillandsia 'Lit'l Lucy'

References

chlorophylla
Plants described in 1938
Flora of Guatemala
Flora of Belize
Flora of Mexico